Nicolas Raynier (born 4 March 1984) is a retired French football striker.

Honours
Lille
UEFA Intertoto Cup: 2004

References

1984 births
Living people
People from Carcassonne
Association football forwards
French footballers
AS Monaco FC players
Lille OSC players
FC Sète 34 players
Amiens SC players
US Boulogne players
Ligue 1 players
Ligue 2 players
Championnat National players
Sportspeople from Aude
Footballers from Occitania (administrative region)